Ewald O. "Jumbo" Stiehm (April 9, 1886 – August 18, 1923) was an American football player, coach of football and basketball, and college athletics administrator.  He served as the head football coach at Ripon College in Ripon, Wisconsin (1910), the University of Nebraska–Lincoln (1911–1915), and Indiana University (1916–1921), compiling a career college football record of 59–23–4.  Stiehm was also the head basketball coach at Nebraska from 1911 to 1915 and at Indiana from 1919 to 1920, tallying a career mark of 69–22.

Coaching career

Stiehm began his coaching career at Ripon College in 1910, where he led the Red Hawks football team to a 4–3 record.  From 1911 to 1915, he coached football at Nebraska, and compiled a 35–2–3 record.  From 1913 to 1915, his teams went undefeated seasons. In the history of the Nebraska Cornhuskers football program, Stiehm has the highest winning percentage (.913) of anyone who coached more than two games. From 1916 to 1921, he coached at Indiana, and compiled a 20–18–1 record.

Death
Stiehm died on August 18, 1923 in Bloomington, Indiana at the age of 37 after an 11-month bout with stomach cancer.

Head coaching record

Football

Basketball

References

1886 births
1923 deaths
American football centers
Basketball coaches from Wisconsin
Indiana Hoosiers athletic directors
Indiana Hoosiers football coaches
Indiana Hoosiers men's basketball coaches
Nebraska Cornhuskers football coaches
Nebraska Cornhuskers men's basketball coaches
People from Johnson Creek, Wisconsin
Ripon Red Hawks football coaches
Ripon Red Hawks men's basketball coaches
Wisconsin Badgers football players